The Aquatic Center is a swimming, diving, and recreational facility in the city of Bakersfield, California, USA. It is located near Centennial Garden, newly renamed " Arena", in downtown Bakersfield. The Aquatic Center opened in June 2004. Combined with the Bakersfield Ice Sports Center, it has a large recreation pool and a heated competition pool, with lifeguards on duty during business hours. The facility hosts activities such as aquatic fitness, diving, lap swim, recreation swim, scuba, water polo, and much more. The facility hosts various local high school swim meets and is used by Bakersfield, California community members for recreational swimming.

The  recreation pool, features: zero depth entry, child play features, double water slides, plunge pool, diving boards, water volleyball area, and specially designed interactive wet play equipment. The recreation area includes picnic areas for public use and party rentals. 

The heated Olympic-sized pool at the Aquatic Center has 9 25-yard lanes, 9 50-meter lanes and a pair of one- and three-meter diving boards. The pool's shallow end is 3 feet, 6 inches deep and the pool's deep end is 14 feet, 2 inches deep.

The Mcmurtrey's
The McMurtrey Aquatic Center was named after the McMurtrey family, long-time residents of Bakersfield, who donated the sum of $250,000 on March 13, 2003. Don McMurtrey, the family spokesperson, son of prominent residents Mac and Stella McMurtrey, and retired "joint"-CEO (with brother Jon McMurtrey) of Southern Auto Supply, stated that "..they want the complex to be a state-of-the-art facility for the community." The family also has a special interest in providing funds for the equipment that will be needed for school swim competitions and other related activities.

News

On Sunday, October 24, 2004, The McMurtrey Aquatic Center made news when four local Olympians, who had trained at the aquatics center, were honored there, with a celebration for achieving the pinnacle of success in their respective competitions during the 2004 Summer Olympics. The ceremony was hosted by Council member Sue Benham and KGET-Channel 17's Robin Mangarin and Jim Scott. Gabe Woodward, a Stockdale High School graduate, won a bronze medal in the Men's’ 4 x 100 meter relay; Rebecca Giddens, a part-time Kernville resident, won a silver medal in the Women's’ K1 kayak slalom; Larsen Jensen, Garces Memorial High School alumnus, won a silver medal in the 1,500 meter freestyle competitive swim; and Joey Hansen, a Bakersfield High School graduate, won a gold medal in the Men's’ Eight Rowing event.

The aquatics center then got recognition again on April 5, 2006, when Stuart and Misty Rex were presented with the official certificate from the Guinness Book of World Records. March 26 marked the one-year anniversary of the couple who held their underwater marriage at the McMurtrey Aquatics Center. Stuart and Misty Rex were informed by the Guinness Book of World Records in November 2005 that their event, with 208 attendees, has set the world record for the largest underwater wedding.

Events
Many national events have taken place at, or reference McMurtrey Aquatic Center. This list represents a selection of those which feature specific references to the aquatics center.

 Four locals Olympians, who had trained at the aquatics center, where honored there on October 24, 2004, for achieving the pinnacle of success in their respective competitions.
 Stuart and Misty Rex made it into the Guinness Book of World Records, with their March 2005 nuptials at the aquatic center, for the largest underwater wedding ever performed.

References

Swimming venues in California
Sports venues in Bakersfield, California
Parks in Bakersfield, California
Parks in Kern County, California